The Best Part is a 1956 French-Italian drama film directed by Yves Allégret and starring Gérard Philipe.

It had admissions in France of 1,976,595.

Cast
 Gérard Philipe as Philippe Perrin
 Michèle Cordoue as Micheline
 Gérard Oury as Gérard Bailly
 Umberto Spadaro as Gino
 Georges Chamarat as Lemoigne
 Valeria Moriconi as Odette
 Olivier Hussenot as Colombin

References

External links
 
 
 

1956 films
French drama films
Italian drama films
Films directed by Yves Allégret
1950s French films
1950s Italian films